Negar Forouzandeh (born 24 June 1978 in Tehran) is an Iranian actress.

Career
Among her many films are Ekhrajiha and Dayere Zangi. She has worked with many famous Iranian directors such as Dariush Mehrjui, Masoud Kimiai, Ebrahim Hatamikia and Parisa Bakhtavar.
Negar Forouzandeh was trained by Hamid Samandarian before entering the film industry.

She has appeared in a number of series, including ‘Detective Alavi’ (1996), ‘Tiptoe’ (2002), ‘I'm a Tenant’ (2004), ‘Reyhaneh’ (2005), ‘The Rich and the Poor’ (2010) and ‘The Decius City’ (2011).

She has also played in several movies such as ‘Hidden Games’ (1995), ‘Mix’ (1999), ‘Café Setare’ (2004), ‘The Outcasts 1’ (2006), ‘Cry Out Loud’ (2006), ‘Tambourine’ (2007), ‘The Outcasts 2’ (2008), ‘Invitation’ (2008), ‘The First Condition’ (2009) and ‘The Outcasts 3’ (2010).

Filmography 
 Rich and Poor (TV series)
 ekhrajiha.3
 ekhrajiha.2
 Ekhrajiha
 shart aval
 mohakemeh dar khiaban
 Dayere Zangi
 cafe setareh
 davat be sham
 bazihaye penhan
 afsoongar
 kami shirin basi farhad
 davat
 boland gerye kon
 papital
 mix
 masoom
 poshte divar shisheh

References

1. iranactor
2. بیوگرافی نگار فروزنده
3. آپارات | aparat.com
4. نگار فروزنده :بعضی ها به جای جراحی زیبایی ذهنشان را درمان کنند
5.  انتشار عکسی که نگار فروزنده را شاکی کرد 
6. نگار فروزنده: بعد از فوت پدرم کم‌کار شدم 
7. ناگفته‌های نگار فروزنده از یک شایعه در فضای مجازی
8. نگار فروزنده: بعضی‌ها به‌جای جراحی زیبایی ذهنشان را درمان کنند
9. فیلم‌های نگار فروزنده | Negar Forouzandeh films
10. Negar Forouzandeh Biography | نگار فروزنده بیوگرافی

External links

 
 Negar Forouzandeh at Sourehcinema
 Negar Forouzandeh at ifilm

Living people
1978 births
People from Tehran
Iranian film actresses
Iranian child actresses
Iranian television actresses